Calumet High School is located in Calumet, Michigan in Michigan's Keweenaw Peninsula. It serves grades 9-12 for the Public Schools of Calumet-Laurium-Keweenaw. The high school shares its building with Washington Middle School.

History
The school was established in 1867 during a copper boom in the Upper Peninsula. The school itself is a product of the powerful Calumet and Hecla Mining Company that once owned and operated much of Calumet. In the late 19th and early 20th century Calumet became a large, prosperous town. The population drastically went down once the mines began to close down during the 1940s and 1950s.

Academics
Current courses of study include Academic, Engineering, Business, Tech and Trades. , Calumet High School offers two AP courses, including AP Computer Science Principles and AP Computer Science A.

Attendance boundary
Within Houghton County, the school district (and therefore the high school attendance boundary) includes Calumet, Copper City, and Laurium. The district includes the majority of Calumet Township, much of Osceola Township, and a section of Schoolcraft Township.

Within Keweenaw County, the district includes Ahmeek, Eagle Harbor, Eagle River, Fulton, and Mohawk. Townships include Allouez Township, Eagle Harbor Township, and Houghton Township.

Demographics
The demographic breakdown of the 496 students enrolled in 2018-19 was:

 Male - 46.2%
 Female - 53.8%
 Native American - 0.4%
 Asian - 0.8%
 Hispanic - 0.8%
 Pacific Islander - 0.2%
 White - 96.4%
 Multiracial - 1.4%

In addition, 47.2% of students were eligible for free or reduced-price lunch.

Athletics
The Calumet Copper Kings compete in the West-Pac Conference. School colors are blue and grey. For the school year 2019–20, the following Michigan High School Athletic Association (MHSAA) sanctioned sports were offered:

Baseball (boys) 
Basketball (girls and boys) 
Girls state champion - 2015
Bowling (girls and boys) 
Competitive cheerleading (girls)
Cross country (girls and boys) 
Boys Upper Peninsula (UP) champion - 1994, 1996, 1997, 1998
Girls UP champion - 1985, 1987, 1989, 1991, 1992, 1993, 1994, 1995, 2009, 2010, 2012
Football (boys)
Golf (girls and boys) 
Boys UP champion - 1997, 1998
Girls UP champion - 1991, 1995
Gymnastics (girls) 
UP champion - 1988
Ice hockey (boys) 
State champion - 1992, 1993, 1996, 1998, 2003, 2008
Skiing (boys) 
Softball (girls) 
Track and field (girls and boys) 
Boys UP champion - 1971, 1975, 1987, 1998, 1999
Girls UP champion - 1988, 2006
Volleyball (girls)

Notable alumni
George Brunet, baseball player
George Gipp, college football player
Ben Johnson, ice hockey player
Russ McLeod, NFL football player
Verna Grahek Mize, environmental activist
Les Ollila, evangelist

References

External links

School district website

Public high schools in Michigan
Schools in Houghton County, Michigan
1867 establishments in Michigan
Calumet and Hecla Mining Company
School buildings completed in 1867